Latronico is a town and comune in the province of Potenza, in the Southern Italian region of Basilicata.  Due to its high elevation of  it is much cooler, even in summer, than the larger cities along the coasts.

References

Cities and towns in Basilicata